Michael Wood is an American special effects artist. He was nominated for an Academy Award in the category Best Visual Effects for the film Poltergeist.

Selected filmography 
 Poltergeist (1982; co-nominated with Richard Edlund and Bruce Nicholson)

References

External links 

Living people
Place of birth missing (living people)
Year of birth missing (living people)
Visual effects artists
Visual effects supervisors